AraBella is a 2023 Philippine television drama series broadcast by GMA Network. Directed by Adolf Alix, Jr., it stars Shayne Sava and Althea Ablan in the title role. It premiered on March 6, 2023 on the network's Afternoon Prime line up replacing Unica Hija.

The series is streaming online on YouTube.

Cast and characters
Lead cast
 Shayne Sava as Amara "Ara" / Angeline Manalo
 Althea Ablan as Isabella "Bella" A. Montecillo

Supporting cast
 Camille Prats as Roselle Abad-Montecillo
 Alfred Vargas as Ariel
 Wendell Ramos as Gary
 Klea Pineda as Gwendoline "Gwen" Abad
 Abdul Raman as Justin
 Saviour Ramos as Ed Sanchez
 Nova Villa as Madonna
 Ronnie Lazaro as Hadji
 Faye Lorenzo as Charice
 Thia Thomalla as Asher
 Madelaine Nicolas as Vina
 Luis Hontiveros as Elton
 Mitzi Josh as Aicelle

Guest cast
 Ricardo Cepeda as Iñigo Abad
 Antonio Aquitania as Ronnie
 Brianna Advincula as young Ara
 Juharra Asayo as young Bella
 Luri Vincent Nalus as Jiro
 Marx Topacio as Jed
 Sherilyn Reyes-Tan as Nora

 Seb Pajarillo as Jim
 Karennina Haniel as Lani Manalo
 Euleen Castro as Abba
 Jorrybell Agoto as Dara

Episodes

References

External links
 
 

2023 Philippine television series debuts
Filipino-language television shows
GMA Network drama series
Television shows set in the Philippines